The Pinckney Island National Wildlife Refuge is a  National Wildlife Refuge located in Beaufort County, South Carolina between the mainland and Hilton Head Island. Named after Major General Charles Cotesworth Pinckney, it was established to provide a nature and forest preserve for aesthetic and conservation purposes.

The refuge is one of seven refuges administered by the Savannah Coastal Refuges Complex in Savannah, Georgia. The complex has a combined staff of 31 with a fiscal year 2005 budget of $3,582,000.

History
Pinckney Island NWR is archaeologically rich, with 115 prehistoric and historic sites identified.  Analysis of the prehistoric sites indicate human occupation dating from the Archaic Period (8000-1000 BC), with intensive use during the Mississippian Period (1000-1500 AD).  
   
Historic artifacts indicate that small scale, impermanent settlements were made on Pinckney by French and Spanish groups in the 16th and 17th centuries. By 1715, Mackay had acquired the rest of the island, as well as most of the other islands which comprise the present refuge. In 1736, Mackay's widow sold the islands to Charles Pinckney, father of General Charles Cotesworth Pinckney.

General Pinckney was a commander during the Revolutionary War, a signer of the United States Constitution, and, in 1804 and 1808, a presidential candidate for the Federalist Party. After he inherited the islands from his father, Pinckney was an absentee landowner until 1804, when he moved to the island and began managing the property. The Pinckney family developed the islands into a plantation, removing much of the maritime forest and draining and tilling the fertile soil.

The plantation flourished until the American Civil War, when it was occupied by Union troops and the enslaved people were liberated.  Small skirmishes took place on Pinckney Island.  The most significant incident occurred on August 21, 1862, when the Confederate Beaufort Light Artillery/11th Infantry attacked the camp of Company H, Third Regiment, New Hampshire Volunteers, killing four Union soldiers and wounding ten men (eight Confederate, two Union).

US Army records reflect that black troops were recruited for the Union Army from the area.  Five military (U.S. Colored Troops) headstones are located in a cemetery on the northwest side of Pinckney Island.  It is possible that the U.S. Army had recruited slaves from those owned by the Pinckneys.

After the war and late century agricultural recession, the plantation did not prosper.  By the 1930s, it was virtually abandoned.  In 1937, after more than 200 years of Pinckney family ownership, the plantation was sold to Ellen Bruce, wife of James Bruce, a New York banker who used the property as a hunting preserve.  The Bruces planted hardwoods and pine, built ponds to attract waterfowl and provide for irrigation, and placed 70 percent of the farm fields back into cultivation.

In 1954 Edward Starr and James Madison Barker, a distinguished MIT alumnus and early leader in the field of international business, purchased the islands.  They continued to manage them as a game preserve.  In 1975, they donated the islands to the United States Fish and Wildlife Service to be managed exclusively as a National Wildlife Refuge (NWR) and as a nature and forest preserve for aesthetic and conservation purposes. The Pinckney Island NWR was established on December 4, 1975.

Topography
The  refuge includes Pinckney Island, Corn Island, Big Harry and Little Harry Islands, Buzzard Island and numerous small hammocks.  Pinckney is the largest of the islands and the only one open to public use.  Nearly 67% of the refuge consists of salt marsh and tidal creeks.  A wide variety of land types are found on Pinckney Island alone:  saltmarsh, forestland, brushland, fallow field and freshwater ponds.  In combination, these habitats support a diversity of bird and plant life.

Wildlife
Wildlife commonly observed on Pinckney Island include waterfowl, shorebirds, wading birds, raptors, neo-tropical migrants, and white-tailed deer, with large concentrations of white ibis, herons, and egrets. Other species include the American alligator, flatwoods salamander, nine-banded armadillo, bald eagle, and the wood stork.

Facilities
There is no visitor center at the refuge. However, there are opportunities for hiking, cycling, photography and wildlife observation.

Each year the refuge holds a one-day quota deer hunt to ensure that population numbers remain in balance with the surrounding habitat. However, fishing is prohibited from the land portions of the refuge.

Trails

 Ibis Pond - , round trip; one and a half hours walking at a leisurely pace
 Shell Point - , round trip; four hours and 15 minutes
 Wood Stork Pond - , round trip; two and a half hours
 Osprey Pond - , round trip; three hours
 Nini Chapin Pond - , round trip; three and a half hours
 Bull Point - , round trip; five hours
 Dick Point - , round trip; six and a half hours
 Clubhouse Pond - , round trip; five and a half hours
 White Point - , round trip; seven hours

See also
 List of National Wildlife Refuges

External links
 Pinckney Island National Wildlife Refuge homepage
 FWS profile of Pinckney Island NWR

Protected areas of Beaufort County, South Carolina
Islands of South Carolina
National Wildlife Refuges in South Carolina
Pinckney family
Wetlands of South Carolina
Islands of Beaufort County, South Carolina
1975 establishments in South Carolina